Auchinleck Castle was a castle built on a rocky promontory on the eastern bank of the Lugar Water, East Ayrshire, Scotland across the river from Ochiltree Castle. It was built by the Auchinleck family in the 13th century.

The remains of the castle are designated a scheduled ancient monument.

See also
Wallace's Cave, Auchinleck - lies just downstream from the castle.

References

External links
Video footage of the Castle, Castle Well and access steps

Castles in East Ayrshire
Scheduled Ancient Monuments in East Ayrshire